Abitibi-Ouest  may refer to:

 Abitibi-Ouest (electoral district)
 Abitibi-Ouest Regional County Municipality, Quebec